
Year 470 BC was a year of the pre-Julian Roman calendar. At the time, it was known as the Year of the Consulship of Potitus and Mamercus (or, less frequently, year 284 Ab urbe condita). The denomination 470 BC for this year has been used since the early medieval period, when the Anno Domini calendar era became the prevalent method in Europe for naming years.

Events 
 By place 
 Greece 
 Suspected of plotting to seize power in Sparta by instigating a helot uprising, Pausanias takes refuge in the Temple of Athena of the Brazen House to escape arrest. The sanctuary is respected, but the Spartans wall in the sanctuary and starve Pausanias to death.

 By topic 
 Architecture 
 The construction of the Temple of Zeus, begins at Olympia, Greece. This includes the relief sculpture (of which fragments now remain at the Archaeological Museum of Olympia) of Apollo with battling Lapiths and centaurs (approximate date).

 Art 
 The Charioteer, in the Sanctuary of Apollo, Delphi, is created in commemoration of a victory in the Pythian Games of 478 or 474 BC (approximate date). It is now preserved at the Delphi Archaeological Museum.
 Pan Painter makes a "bell krater" (an earthenware piece that is used to mix water and wine) which has a red-figure decoration of Artemis slaying Actaeon. It is now preserved at the Museum of Fine Arts in Boston (approximate date).

Births 
 Aspasia of Miletus, mistress of Pericles of Athens (d. c. 400 BC)
 Hippocrates of Chios, Greek mathematician (d. c. 410 BC)
 Mozi (or Mo Tzu), Chinese philosopher (d. c. 391)
 Socrates, Greek philosopher (d. c. 399 BC)

Deaths 
 Pausanias, Spartan commander during the Greco-Persian Wars

References